Brown Sabbath is the debut studio album by New Zealand band Deja Voodoo that was released in 2004.  It is a "beer-themed" concept album.

Track listing
 "We Are Deja Voodoo"
 "Beers"
 "Today, Tomorrow, Timaru"
 "Your Boyfriend Sucks"
 "P"
 "Jack the Ripper"
 "One Horse Town"
 "Feelings"
 "Randy"
 "250 ffm"
 "More Beers"

References

Deja Voodoo (New Zealand band) albums
2004 albums